Vengambur is a panchayat town in Erode district in the Indian state of Tamil Nadu.

Demographics
 India census, Vengambur had a population of 7634. Males constitute 50% of the population and females 50%. Vengambur has an average literacy rate of 66%, higher than the national average of 59.5%: male literacy is 77%, and female literacy is 56%. In Vengambur, 8% of the population is under 6 years of age.

References

Cities and towns in Erode district